Elifas Tozo Bisanda (born in 10 October 1956) is a Tanzanian academic Professor of Mechanical Engineering and Vice-Chancellor of Open University of Tanzania since 2015. He is also currently the Chairperson of the UNESCO National Commission of the United Republic of Tanzania. 

He is also the former chairperson of the Governing Council of the Institute of Adult Education in Tanzania, the chairman of the Council of Morogoro Vocational Teachers College, the member of the University of Arusha Council and the Police Training Board. He is also a Chairman of SIDO (Small Industries Development Organization) in Tanzania. Bisanda is also a board member of Association of African Universities.

See also

References

Year of birth missing (living people)
Living people
Tanzanian engineers
21st-century Tanzanian people
Open University of Tanzania
University of Dar es Salaam alumni
University of Bath
Cranfield University